The 1911 Canadian federal election was held on September 21, 1911 to elect members of the House of Commons of Canada of the 12th Parliament of Canada.

The central issue was Liberal support for a proposed agreement with the United States to lower tariffs. The Conservative Party denounced it because it threatened to weaken ties with Britain, submerge the Canadian economy and Canadian identity with the US, and lead to American annexation of Canada. The idea of a Canadian Navy was also an issue.

The Conservatives won, and Robert Borden became the eighth prime minister. The election ended 15 years of government by the Liberal Party of Wilfrid Laurier.

Navy
The Liberal government was caught up in a debate over the naval arms race between the British Empire and Germany. Laurier attempted a compromise by starting up the Canadian Navy (now the Royal Canadian Navy) but failed to appease either the French-Canadians or English-Canadians: the former refused giving any aid, and the latter suggested sending money directly to Britain. After the election, the Conservatives drew up a bill for naval contributions to the British, but it was held up by a lengthy Liberal filibuster before it was passed in the House of Commons by invoking closure, only to be defeated by the Liberal-controlled Senate.

Ties to Britain
Many English Canadians in British Columbia and the Maritimes felt that Laurier was abandoning Canada's traditional links to their mother country, Great Britain. On the other side, the Quebec nationalist Henri Bourassa, who had earlier quit the Liberal Party over what he considered the government's pro-British policies, campaigned against Laurier in the province. Ironically, Bourassa's attacks on Laurier in Quebec aided in the election of the Conservatives, who held policies that were more staunchly imperialist than those of the Liberals.

In mid-1910, Laurier had attempted to kill the naval issue, which was settling English-Canadians against French-Canadians by opening talks for a reciprocity treaty with the United States. He believed that an economically-favourable treaty would appeal to most Canadians and have the additional benefit of dividing the Conservatives between the western wing of the party, which had long wanted free trade with the United States, and the eastern wing, which was more hostile to Continentalism.

In January 1911, Laurier and US President William Howard Taft announced that they signed a reciprocity agreement, which they decided to pass by concurrent legislation rather than a formal treaty, as would normally have been the case. As such, the reciprocity agreement had to be ratified by both houses of the US Congress rather than just the US Senate, which Laurier would later regret.

Ties to United States
The base of Liberal support shifted to Western Canada, which sought markets for its agricultural products. The party had long been a proponent of free trade with the United States. The protected manufacturing businesses of Central Canada were strongly against the idea. The Liberals, who by ideology and history had strongly supported free trade, decided to make the issue the central plank of their re-election strategy, and they negotiated a free trade agreement in natural products with the United States.

Clark speech
Allen argues that two speeches by American politicians gave the Conservatives the ammunition needed to arouse anti-American, pro-British sentiments, which provided the winning votes. The Speaker of the US House of Representatives was a Democrat, Champ Clark, and he declared, on the floor of the House, "I look forward to the time when the American flag will fly over every square foot of British North America up to the North Pole. The people of Canada are of our blood and language." Clark went on to suggest in his speech that reciprocity agreement was the first step towards the end of Canada, a speech that was greeted with "prolonged applause" according to the Congressional Record. The Washington Post reported, "Evidently, then, the Democrats generally approved of Mr. Clark's annexation sentiments and voted for the reciprocity bill because, among other things, it improves the prospect of annexation."

The Chicago Tribune, in an editorial, condemned Clark and warned that Clark's speech might have fatally damaged the reciprocity agreement in Canada and stated, "He lets his imagination run wild like a Missouri mule on a rampage. Remarks about the absorption of one country by another grate harshly on the ears of the smaller."

A Republican Representative, William Stiles Bennet, a member of the House Foreign Relations Committee, introduced a resolution that asked the Taft administration to begin talks with Britain on how the United States might best annex Canada. Taft rejected the proposal and asked the committee to take a vote on the resolution, which only Bennett supported, but the Conservatives now had more ammunition. Since Bennett, a strong protectionist, had been an opponent of the reciprocity agreement, the Canadian historian Chantal Allen suggested that Bennett had introduced his resolution deliberately inflame Canadian opinion against the reciprocity agreement. Clark's speech had already provoked massive outrage in Canada. Bennett's resolution was taken by many Canadians as more proof that the Conservatives were right that the reciprocity agreement would result in the US annexing Canada.

The Washington Post noted that the effect of Clark's speech and Bennett's resolution in Canada had "roused the opponents of reciprocity in and out of Parliament to the highest pitch of excitement they have yet reached". The Montreal Daily Star, English Canada's most widely read newspaper and had supported the Liberals and reciprocity, now did a volte-face and turned against the reciprocity agreement. In an editorial, it wrote, "None of us realized the inward meaning of the shrewdly framed offer of the long headed American government when we first saw it. It was as cunning a trap as ever laid. The master bargainers of Washington have not lost their skill."

Anti-Americanism
Contemporary accounts mentioned in the aftermath of Clark's speech that anti-Americanism was at an all-time high in Canada. Many American newspapers advised their readers that if they visited Canada, they should not identify themselves as American, or they could become the objects of abuse and hatred from the Canadians. The New York Times, in a July 1911 report stated that Laurier was "having the fight of his career to carry reciprocity at all". One Conservative MP compared the relationship of Finance Minister William Stevens Fielding and Taft to Samson and Delilah, with Fielding having "succumbed to the Presidential blandishments."

When the reciprocity agreement was submitted by Laurier to the House of Commons for ratification by Parliament, the Conservatives waged a vigorous filibuster against the reciprocity agreement on the floor of the House. Although the Liberals still had two years left in their mandate, they decided to call an election to settle the issue after it had aroused controversy, and Laurier was unable to break the filibuster.

Borden largely ran on a platform of opposing the reciprocity agreement under the grounds that it would "Americanize" Canada and claimed that there was a secret plan on the part of the Taft administration to annex Canada, with the reciprocity agreement being only the first step. In his first speech given in London, Borden declared, "It is beyond doubt that the leading public men of the United States, its leading press, and the mass of its people believe annexation of the Dominion to be the ultimate, inevitable, and desirable result of this proposition, and for that reason support it."

To support his claims, the Conservatives produced thousands of pamphlets reproducing the speeches of Clark and Bennett, which encouraged a massive burst of anti-Americanism that was sweeping across English Canada in 1911.

One American newspaper wrote that the Conservatives were portraying the Americans as "a corrupt, bragging, boodle-hunting and negro lynching crowd from which Canadian workingmen and the Canadian land of milk and honey must be saved." On 7 September 1911, the Montreal Star published a front-page appeal to all Canadians by the popular British poet Rudyard Kipling, who had been asked by his friend, Max Aitken, to write something for the Conservatives. Kipling wrote in his appeal to Canadians, "It is her own soul that Canada risks today. Once that soul is pawned for any consideration, Canada must inevitably conform to the commercial, legal, financial, social and ethical standards which will be imposed on her by the sheer admitted weight of the United States." Kipling's appeal attracted much media attention in English Canada and was reprinted over the next week, in every English newspaper in Canada.

Immigration
In British Columbia, the Conservative Party ran on the slogan "A White Canada" by playing to the fears of British Columbians who resented the increasing presence of cheap Asian labour and the resulting depression in wages.

Results
The campaign went badly for the Liberals, however. The powerful manufacturing interests of Toronto and Montreal switched their allegiance and financing to the Conservatives, who argued that free trade would undermine Canadian sovereignty and lead to a slow annexation of Canada by the US. In an editorial after Borden's victory, the Los Angeles Times wrote: "Their ballots have consigned to everlasting flames the bogy of annexation by the United States which Champ Clark called from the deeps. It was not really a wraith of anything that existed on this side of the line. It was a pumpkin scarehead with blazing eyes, a crooked slit for a nose, and a hideous grinning mouth which the fun-loving Champ placed upon a pole along with the Stars and Stripes, the while he carried terror to loyal Canuck hearts by his derisive shout of annexation."

The election is often compared to the 1988 federal election, which was also fought over free trade, but the positions of the two parties were now reversed, with the Liberals against the Conservatives' trade proposals.

The Conservatives dominated in Ontario, British Columbia and Manitoba. They also made significant gains in Quebec and Atlantic Canada, although the Liberals still won pluralities in both regions. The Liberals continued to dominate in Alberta and Saskatchewan, where free trade was extremely popular. Notably, this remains the most recent federal election where the Liberals would win the most seats in Alberta (although most Albertan Liberals supported the Borden-led Unionist government during the First World War).

National results

Notes:

* Party did not nominate candidates in the previous election.

1 One Conservative candidate was acclaimed in Ontario.

2 One Liberal candidate was acclaimed in Ontario, and two Liberals were acclaimed in Quebec.

Results by province

See also
 
List of Canadian federal general elections
List of political parties in Canada
11th Canadian Parliament

Notes

References
 
 Brown, Robert Craig. Robert Laird Borden: A Biography (1975), the major scholarly biography
 Brown, Robert Craig, and Ramsay Cook. Canada: 1896–1921 (1974)
 Dafoe John W. Clifford Sifton in Relation to His Times. Toronto, 1931.
 Dafoe John W. Laurier: a Study in Canadian Politics. Toronto, 1922.
 
 Ellis, L. Ethan. Reciprocity, 1911: A Study in Canadian-American Relations (1939)  online
 
 
 
 
 Porritt Edward. Sixty Years of Protection in Canada, 1846–1907: Where Industry Leans on the Politicians. (London, 1908)  online
 
 Stevens, Paul D. The 1911 General Election: A Study in Canadian Politics (Toronto: Copp Clard, 1970)

Primary sources
 Borden, Robert. Robert Laird Borden: His Memoirs edited and with an introduction by Henry Borden
 Harpell, James J., Canadian National Economy: the Cause of High Prices and Their Effect upon the Country. Toronto, 1911.

Notes

See also
12th Canadian Parliament

 
1911 elections in Canada
1911
September 1911 events